Murray Milgate (born 1950), is an Australian-born academic economist and Sometime Fellow and director of studies in economics at Queens' College in the University of Cambridge, where he is now a Life Fellow. He is the co-creator and co-editor of the celebrated original edition of The New Palgrave Dictionary of Economics (1987) together with John Eatwell and Peter Newman.

Biography 
Milgate was educated at the University of Sydney and the University of Cambridge where he taught economics before moving to Harvard University in 1984.  He returned to Cambridge in 1996. He is best known for his contributions to the dissemination of economic knowledge through his New Palgrave activities and his published writings that focus on exploring: (1) the relation between classical economic theory and Keynesian economics as an alternative to standard neoclassical thinking about the market mechanism; (2) the history of nineteenth-century political economy.  An assessment of aspects of the first set of contributions can be found in Dutt and Amadeo's Keynes's Third Alternative.  In 1992 Milgate shared the Eccles Prize for Excellence in Economic Writing (from Columbia University Business School) for the New Palgrave Dictionary of Money and Finance and in 1995 The New Palgrave World of Economics was named among the 100 most influential books since WW2 by the CEEPP at the University of Oxford. In 2011 his After Adam Smith was awarded the David and Elaine Spitz Prize for the best book on liberal and democratic theory by the International Conference for the Study of Political Thought.  He was a visiting professor at the University of California at Berkeley (1992) and was made distinguished visiting professor of economics at Osaka Gakuin University in Japan in 2008.  He is a founding editor of the journal Contributions to Political Economy.

Selected bibliography 
This is a list of some of Milgate's major works.

Books

Journal articles

References 

1950 births
Living people
Australian economists
Alumni of the University of Cambridge
Fellows of Queens' College, Cambridge
University of Sydney alumni
Harvard University faculty